Xi Jinping Thought on Diplomacy, officially the "General Secretary Xi Jinping's Thought on Diplomacy", is the current diplomatic and foreign policy doctrine of the People's Republic of China. It is related to the larger Xi Jinping Thought, which is derived from the General Secretary of the Chinese Communist Party Xi Jinping. According to Chinese foreign minister Wang Yi, Xi Jinping Thought on Diplomacy is "the fundamental guideline for China's diplomatic work is an epoch-making milestone in the diplomatic theory of New China." The main point of Xi Jinping Thought on Diplomacy is to orient as much of diplomacy as possible to the bilateral level, while still supporting the formal architecture of the international system. In terms of China's foreign policy, Xi Jinping's "Major Country Diplomacy" doctrine has replaced the earlier Deng Xiaoping era slogan of "keep a low profile" and has legitimized a more active role for China on the world stage, particularly with regards to reform of the international order, engaging in open ideological competition with the West, and assuming a greater responsibility for global affairs in accordance with China's rising power and status.

History
During the first five years of Xi Jinping's leadership the budget for diplomacy doubled. According to Xinhua agency, Xi Jinping Thought on Diplomacy was officially adopted during the Central Conference on Work Relating to Foreign Affairs in 2018.

In July 2020, the Ministry of Foreign Affairs of the People's Republic of China inaugurated a research center for the study of Xi Jinping Thought on Diplomacy.

Reception
Foreign observers have noted that China and the rest of the world play by different rules under Xi Jinping Thought on Diplomacy. This perceived endorsement of Chinese exceptionalism has been criticized as problematic. Wolf warrior diplomacy seems to be positively perceived by the domestic audience, especially those with a more Chinese nationalist point of view.

In terms of theory, parallels have been drawn to Maoist international relations theory, in particular to Mao Zedong's Three Worlds Theory.

See also
 Foreign policy of Xi Jinping
 Ten Major Relationships

References

Chinese foreign policy
Ideology of the Chinese Communist Party
International relations theory
People's Republic of China diplomacy
Xi Jinping Thought